Plicatic acid is a carboxylic acid from the resin acid group. It is naturally found in Thuja and cypress resin. It is the main irritant and contact allergen present in thuja wood; in contrast to pine, where the primary irritant is abietic acid.

The highest concentrations of plicatic acid can be found in Thuja plicata (western red cedar), but Thuja occidentalis (eastern arborvitae) and Cryptomeria japonica (sugi) contain it in significant proportions as well.

Exposure to plicatic acid or Thuja wood dust can worsen asthma and provoke allergic reactions.

References 

O-methylated natural phenols
Cupressaceae